Thermovirga is a Gram-negative, anaerobic and motile genus of bacteria from the family of Synergistaceae with one known species (Thermovirga lienii). Thermovirga lienii has been isolated from production water from an oil well from the North Sea in Norway.

References

Synergistota
Bacteria genera
Monotypic bacteria genera